Dorimond (sometime spelt Dorimont or Dorimon), real name Nicolas Drouin (1628–1693), was a 17th-century French comedian and playwright, who was born and died in Paris. In the early 1660s, he published some plays that have influenced (or were influenced by) Molière, which is the main reason why his name is not forgotten.

Works 
1655: L'Apologie du théâtre, Rouen
1658: Le Festin de pierre ou le Fils criminel
1659: La Précaution inutile ou l'École des cocus
1659: L'Inconstance punie
1660: L'Amant de sa femme
1661: La Femme industrieuse
1661: La Rosélie

External links
 His plays and their presentations on CÉSAR
 Page devoted to Dorimond on Molière21 (Université de Paris-Sorbonne)
 « Biographie de Dorimon » on don-juan.net  (Académie de Civilisation et de Cultures Européennes)

17th-century French male actors
French male stage actors
17th-century French dramatists and playwrights
17th-century French male writers
1628 births
1693 deaths